Joseph Projectus Machebeuf (August 11, 1812 – July 10, 1889) was a French Roman Catholic missionary and the first Bishop of Denver.

Biography
The oldest of five children, Machebeuf was born in Riom to Michael and Gilberte (née Plauc) Machebeuf. He received his early education from the Brothers of the Christian Schools, and studied the classics in the college of his native city. He then entered the Sulpician-run seminary of Montferrand in 1831, and upon completing his course in philosophy and theology, was ordained to the priesthood by Bishop Louis-Charles Féron on December 17, 1836. He served as a curate in Le Cendre until 1839, when he accepted the invitation of Bishop John Baptist Purcell to join the Diocese of Cincinnati, Ohio, in the United States. He was first assigned as a curate in Tiffin and then as pastor of Lower Sandusky and Sandusky, Ohio in 1841.  He founded Holy Angels Catholic Church, Sandusky, St Ann's Catholic Church, Fremont, and St Philomena's Catholic Church, La Prairie, before leaving Ohio in 1851 to join his friend, Jean-Baptiste Lamy in New Mexico.

Following the elevation of Jean-Baptiste Lamy to Vicar Apostolic of New Mexico in 1850, Machebeuf accompanied him and became his vicar-general. He served as pastor at Albuquerque (1853–1858) and at Santa Fe (1858–1860) before being transferred to Colorado, where he was thrown from his carriage while descending a spur of the Rocky Mountains and lamed for life. Afterwards, he would conclude his letters with, "Pray always for the poor cripple". In Colorado, he organized parishes, procured priests and by 1868 had erected eighteen churches including the first church in Denver.

On March 3, 1868, Machebeuf was appointed Vicar Apostolic of Colorado and Utah as well as Titular Bishop of Epiphania in Cilicia by Pope Pius IX. He received his episcopal consecration on the following August 16 from Bishop Purcell, with Bishops Louis Amadeus Rappe and Louis De Goesbriand serving as co-consecrators. He founded an academy and a school for boys in Denver (not to be confused with the college preparatory high school named in his honor, but founded after his death), a convent of the Sisters of Loretto, St. Joseph's Hospital, House of the Good Shepherd and the College of the Sacred Heart (now part of Regis University). The Catholic population of Colorado increased under his tenure from a few thousand to upwards of 50,000.

On August 7, 1887, the vicariate was elevated to the rank of a diocese, and Machebeuf was named its first bishop. He died two years later, aged 76.

His life was the basis for the character Joseph Vaillant in Willa Cather's 1927 novel Death Comes for the Archbishop.

He is also the namesake of Bishop Machebeuf High School, located in Denver, CO. The school was founded in 1958.

References

External links
 

1812 births
1889 deaths
People from Riom
French Roman Catholic missionaries
French emigrants to the United States
French Roman Catholic bishops in North America
Roman Catholic bishops of Denver
19th-century Roman Catholic bishops in the United States
Roman Catholic missionaries in the United States